The 2010 Weltklasse Zürich was an outdoor track and field meeting in Zürich, Switzerland. Held on 18–19 August at the Letzigrund, it was the thirteenth leg of the inaugural IAAF Diamond League – the highest level international track and field circuit – and the first half of the final for 2010 (the second half being held during the Memorial Van Damme in Brussels, Belgium on 27 August). The women's shot put was held at Zürich Main Station on the 18th, with the rest of the events following on the 19th at the Letzigrund.

Diamond League champions

Belarusian athlete Nadezhda Ostapchuk originally won the women's shot put with the most points and was declared champion. After retests of Ostapchuk's samples from prior competitions showed multiple doping offenses, she was disqualified and New Zealander Valerie Adams, who had finished second at the meet and in points, was recognized as the champion.

Records
The following records were set at the meet:

American athlete Jeremy Wariner also ran a world leading 44.13 in the men's 400 m, the fastest time in 2010.

Belarusian athlete Nadezhda Ostapchuk originally threw a meeting record 20.63 m in the women's shot put, but the mark was later annulled for doping.

Diamond League results

Men

Women

Non-Diamond League results

Men

Women

See also
2010 Memorial Van Damme (second half of the Diamond League final)

References

Results
Results Archive Diamond League. Retrieved 20 February 2020.

External links
Official Diamond League Weltklasse Zürich website

2010
Weltklasse Zürich
Weltklasse Zürich